Climax is an unincorporated community on the border of Guilford and Randolph counties, North Carolina, United States. Its ZIP code is 27233. The center of the community is in Fentress Township in Guilford County, but development with Climax mailing addresses extends south into Providence Township in Randolph County. The community is located along North Carolina Highway 62, west of its junction with the U.S. Highway 421 freeway. North Carolina Highway 22 leads south from NC 62 in the east part of Climax into Randolph County. Climax is just south of the town of Pleasant Garden.

The community is home to the Hobson Cricket Grounds, where teams from the Mid Atlantic Cricket Conference compete. A small general aviation airport (Southeast Greensboro) is located in Climax, and the community was home to one of J.P. Morgan's quail hunting clubs known as the Climax Corporation.

History
A post office called "Climax" has been in operation since 1891. The community was named for being located at a high point along the Atlantic & Yadkin Railway, as well as being situated near the northernmost  point of Randolph County.

References

External links

 Atlantic & Yadkin Railway

Unincorporated communities in Guilford County, North Carolina
Unincorporated communities in North Carolina